"" (Fair Lisa) is a Welsh folk song. It is a lover's lament for Lisa, ending when the heartsick lover asks dead Lisa to guide him to where she is, so that he may be reunited with her.

Lyrics

Melody

Cultural references
The English composer Gustav Holst arranged this song in 1930–1931 for his collection 12 Welsh Folk Songs for mixed chorus.

The song's melody is an instrumental theme throughout Paul Haggis's 2004 film Crash and an extract of the song itself is featured at the film's climax.

References

External links
, performed by Siân James, 2010
, performed by Catrin Finch
, performed by Colorama

Welsh folk songs